The Last Rebel is a 1993 album by Lynyrd Skynyrd.

The Last Rebel may also refer to:

 The Last Rebel (1918 film)
 The Last Rebel (1958 film), a Mexican western film
 The Last Rebel (1971 film), an American Technicolor Western film